Massab is a large 12th-century khan in Syria.

See also
Khan Jaqmaq
Khan As'ad Pasha
Khan Sulayman Pasha
 Khan Tuman (operation)

References

Buildings and structures completed in 1189
Buildings and structures completed in 1478
Buildings and structures completed in 1652
Caravanserais in Syria
Islamic architecture
Buildings and structures in Aleppo Governorate